Calderoni is an Italian surname. Notable people with the surname include:

Alex Calderoni (born 1976), Italian footballer
Guillermo González Calderoni (1949-2003), Commander of the Mexican Federal Judicial Police
Marco Calderoni (born 1989), Italian footballer

Italian-language surnames